Symphony of Dialogue (2009) by the Turkish composer Evrim Demirel reflects the composer's influences on both contemporary Western and traditional Turkish music.  The piece based on the dialogue of diverse cultures; it embraces Christianity, Judaism and Islam in one work of art and conveys their peaceful messages through the music. The novelty of the “Symphony of Dialogue” is having a traditional Qur'an singer in a western way of composed music.

“Symphony of Dialogue” is a pure message of peace and love through the music, which is entirely humanistic in its nature.

Composition
Musical voyage starts on a steady sustained chord which appears throughout the piece. Stationary chord is interrupted by the timpani hits amplified with the piano. Interruptions evolve new textures and drag the piece into the more anxious musical territories. Steady and unsteady musical structures interact each other through the piece and the singers endeavor to keep music in a more restful atmosphere.

Instrumentation

Woodwinds
3 Flutes
(FL. I also Alto flute, FL. III also Piccolo)
2 Oboes
 English Horn
2 Clarinets in B flat and E flat
 Bass Clarinet
2 Bassoons
Contrabassoon

Brass
4 Horns
3 Trumpets in C
3 Trombones
Bass Trombone
Tuba

Percussion
Timpani
Bass Drum 			
Tom-toms			
2 Congas			
2 Cymbals (Large)
2 Vibraphones
Glockenspiel
Xylophone
2 Harps*
Piano

Voices
Soprano solo
Tenor solo (preferably a traditional Qur'an singer)
Baritone solo

Strings
Violins I, II
Violas
Violoncellos
Double basses

(One of the harp should be tuned in the makam system of Turkish music)

Form
A symbolic expression from the birth to the death of the human being is moulded the form of the work. First tenor solo salutes people by singing a masnavi poem “ Merhaba” which is a part of Mawlid written by Süleyman Çelebi, refers to the observance of the birth of the Islamic Prophet Muhammad. Then soprano delivers the message from the Bible that says “ I become a noisy gong or a clanging cymbal if I have no love”. Restful messages of the religions continues through the voice of the baritone who vocalize a Psalm from the Old Testament that expresses, “love will follow me all the days of my life”. Eventually three vocalists conclude the music with a poem by Yunus Emre.

“Let us be lovers and the loved ones,”
“The earth shall be left to no one.”

Duration
33 Min.

Notes
The piece commissioned by "Het Nederlands Fonds voor Podiumkunsten" and premiered by [Symfonieorkest De Philarmonie]www.dephilharmonie.nl conducted by Daan Admiraal in Muziekgebouw aan't IJ, Amsterdam, The Netherlands.
"Symphony of Dialogue" is dedicated to Daan Admiraal

Vocal parts
Texts taken from New Testament, Old Testament, Qur'an as well as The Means of Salvation, (Vesîletü'n-Necât) or known as Mawlid by Süleyman Çelebi.
Citation of “Tekbir” have been used from traditional Islamic culture as it is composed by Buhurizade Itri

Poem called “Hak cihana doludur“ by Yunus Emre together with English version translated by  Talât Sait Halman

Texts from New Testament used in Latin, from Old Testament used in Hebrew, from Qur'an used in Arabic, from Mawlid in Turkish. During the piece fives languages take part including: Turkish, Latin, Hebrew, Arabic and English in the final.

Contemporary classical compositions
Peace symbols
21st-century symphonies
2009 compositions
Commissioned music